Joseph Dao (June 8, 1936 – October 23, 2011) was the Burkinabé-born Roman Catholic bishop of the Roman Catholic Diocese of Kayes, Mali.

Ordained to the priesthood in 1965, he became a bishop in 1978 retiring in 2011.

Notes

21st-century Roman Catholic bishops in Mali
1936 births
2011 deaths
People from Kayes
20th-century Roman Catholic bishops in Mali
Roman Catholic bishops of Kayes